is a railway station on the Kintetsu Kashihara Line. It is located in Kashihara, Nara, Japan. The station name refers to Unebi Goryō, the tomb of legendary Emperor Jimmu located about 700 meters west of the station.

Lines 
 Kintetsu Railway
 Kashihara Line

Platforms and tracks

Around the station 
East Exit
 Lawson (Convenience store)
 
 Nara Kotsu Bus Lines Kidonoguchi Bus stop
 Mount Ameno-Kagu

West Exit
 Mt. Unebi
 Kashihara Archaeological Institute, Nara prefectural (ja)
 The Museum Kashihara Archaeological Institute, Nara prefecture
 Kashihara Park
 Athletic Stadium
 Baseball Stadium
 Kashihara Shrine
 Unebiyama-no Ushitora-no-sumi-no Misasagi (Unebi Goryō, tomb of Emperor Jimmu)

Number of users 
According to the research on November 10, 2015, 3,872 people per day get on and off trains at Unegigoryōmae Station.

External links 
 

Railway stations in Japan opened in 1923
Railway stations in Nara Prefecture